Illuminati Motor Works Seven is a prototype of a 4-passenger battery electric vehicle.  It was handcrafted by Illuminati Motor Works (IMW), and placed second in the mainstream class of the Progressive Automotive XPRIZE with a combined rating of 119.8 MPGe. It has since achieved an EPA rating of 207 MPGe when tested at the Chrysler proving grounds through funding provided by the X PRIZE foundation and the US Department of Energy and now surpasses the MPGe of all three winning vehicles of the Progressive Automotive XPRIZE.

Illuminati Motor Works 

Illuminati Motor Works is a volunteer group of mostly self-funded automotive enthusiasts, engineers, technicians, and artists located in Central IL. Kevin Smith (Team Leader/Engineer), Nate Knappenburger (Electronics Technician), Jen Danzinger (Graphic Artist/ Web Liaison), Josh Spradlin (Graphic Designer/Parts Hound/ Fabricator), Nick Smith (Master Craftsman), Thomas Pasko (Master Automotive Technician), and George Kennedy (Engineer) comprised the core team at the Progressive Automotive XPRIZE.

Design 

Seven's design emphasizes aerodynamics and is constructed of hand-sculpted foam and fiberglass over a steel frame. In 2013 the body was re-sculpted and molds were created. New body panels were constructed from carbon fiber and Kevlar. It utilizes recycled and off-the-shelf components including a 32 kW hour battery pack (99 Thundersky 100 amp hour lithium iron phosphate cells with 3.2 nominal voltage), a MES DEA 200-330 electric induction motor, modified 1997 Geo Metro/Suzuki Swift transmission, Mazda Miata windshield, and more.

Performance statistics 

Post competition performance statistics are as follows:

Top Speed: 130 MPH
Range: 200+ Miles
Miles Per Gallon equiv.(MPGe): 207.5
Lateral Acceleration: 0.87g
0-60 MPH Acceleration: 6.2 seconds
Accident Avoidance: 48.32 MPH

Awards 
2014  Most Fuel Efficient Vehicle - 2014 Toyota Green Grand Prix 
2014 1st in Class (Exhibition) - 2014 Toyota Green Grand Prix 
2013 Best in Class (Other) - 12th Annual International Route 66 Mother Road Festival
2013 3rd Place EVCCON 1/8 mile drag race

Elimination from Automotive XPrize 

Seven was eliminated from the knockout round of the Progressive Automotive XPrize for failure to achieve 0-60 MPH acceleration within 15 seconds.  This was due to a slipping clutch which had already reduced the vehicle's efficiency to 119.8 MPGe on the track.

References

External links 
Illuminati Motor Works Official Web Site
Ingenious: A True Story Of Invention, Automotive Daring, And The Race To Revive America 
Ahrens,Ronald. "10 Questions For Illuminati's Kevin Smith." Edmunds Auto Obvserver. 2011-02-18. Retrieved 2011-04-14.
Hagerman, Eric. "1 Gallon of Gas, 100 Miles - $10 Million: The Race to Build the Supergreen Car." WIRED magazine. January, 2008.
Olson, Greg. "Local man part of electric car team." Jacksonville Journal-Courier. Jacksonville, IL. 2010-11-09. Retrieved 2011-04-14.
VanHoose, Edward. "Out but not down: Illuminati Motor Works looks to the future." Illinois Country Living. December 2010. Retrieved 2011-04-14.

Electric concept cars
Battery electric vehicles